Barraute-Camu is a commune of the Pyrénées-Atlantiques department in the Nouvelle-Aquitaine region of south-western France.

Geography
Barraute-Camu is located 2 km east by south-east of Sauveterre-de-Béarn and 4 km west by north-west of Montfort. Access to the commune is by the D936 highway from Abitain in the west which passes through the heart of the commune just south of the village and continues east to Araujuzon. The commune is almost all farmland except for some forest along the river and along the southern border.

The Gave d'Oloron forms the northern border of the commune as it flows west to join the Gave de Pau at Peyrehorade to become the Gaves Réunis. The Ruisseau de Lapeyrère rises in the commune and flows north to join the Gave d'Oloron.

Places and Hamlets 

 La Cabé
 Camu
 Campagne de Camu
 Capulet
 Crescent
 Houch
 Lageyre
 Lahitau
 Lasbignasses
 Peyret
 Théas

Toponymy
The commune name in Occitan Gascon is Berrauta-Camun.

Michel Grosclaude said that the name comes from the basque berro: Broussailles and the collective suffix -eta meaning "where there are no bushes" He also stated that Camu most likely comes from the Gascon kamy, the variant kamu meaning "fertile ground next to the river".

The following table details the origins of the commune name and other names in the commune.

Sources:
Grosclaude: Toponymic Dictionary of communes, Béarn, 2006 
Raymond: Topographic Dictionary of the Department of Basses-Pyrenees, 1863, on the page numbers indicated in the table. 
Cassini: 1750 Cassini Map
Ldh/EHESS/Cassini: 

Origins:
Sorde: Cartulary of Sorde
Census: Census of Béarn
Notaries: Notaries of Navarrenx
Reformation: Reformation of Béarn
Ohix: Contracts retained by Ohix, Notary of Soule

History
Barraute appears as Barraute on the 1750 Cassini Map and the same on the 1790 version.

Camu appears as Camu on the 1750 Cassini Map and does not appear on the 1790 version.

Paul Raymond noted on page 21 and 40 of his 1863 dictionary that in 1385 Barraute had 24 fires and Camu 11. Barraute was part of the bailiwick of Navarrenx and Camu in that of Sauveterre.

The communes of Barraute and Camu'' were merged on 14 June 1841.

AdministrationList of Successive MayorsInter-communality
The commune is part of five inter-communal structures:
 the inter-communal centre for social action of Community of communes of Béarn des Gaves;
 the Communauté de communes du Béarn des Gaves;
 the Energy association of Pyrénées-Atlantiques;
 the inter-communal association for management of drinking water from the Saleys and the Gaves;
 the inter-communal association of Gaves and Saleys

Demography
In 2017 the commune had 174 inhabitants.

Economy
The main activity is agricultural. The commune is part of the Appellation d'origine contrôlée of Ossau-iraty

Culture and heritage

Religious heritage
The Church of Saint Cyprien and Saint Justine''' (Middle Ages) is registered as an historical monument. It was restored in the 19th century.

See also
Communes of the Pyrénées-Atlantiques department

References

Communes of Pyrénées-Atlantiques